Members of the parrot genus Psittacula or Afro-Asian ring-necked parrots they are commonly known in aviculture originate from Africa to South-East Asia. It is a widespread group with a clear concentration of species in south Asia, but also with representatives in Africa and the islands of the Indian Ocean. This is the only genus of Parrot which has the majority of its species in continental Asia. Of all the extant species only Psittacula calthropae, Psittacula caniceps and Psittacula echo do not have a representative subspecies in any part of mainland continental Asia. The rose-ringed parakeet, Psittacula krameri, is one of the most widely distributed of all parrots.

The other two Asian genera, Loriculus and Psittinus are represented by only two species each, which occur in the mainland part of Asia. The majority of the Loriculus species occur on islands. Moreover, since Loriculus is spread across both sides of the Wallace Line it can be considered more Australasian than Asian. These parrots mostly have green plumage, with adults having coloured heads. The bill is stout, and the tail is long and graduated.

Etymology
The genus name Psittacula is a diminutive of the Latin word psittacus meaning "parrot".

Taxonomy
The genus Psittacula was introduced in 1800 by the French naturalist Georges Cuvier. The type species was designated in 1923 by Gregory Mathews as the red-breasted parakeet. The name of the genus is a diminutive of the Latin word psittacus for a "parrot".

The genus includes 16 species, of which three are extinct.

 †Newton's parakeet, Psittacula exsul  - extinct (c.1875)
 Echo parakeet, Psittacula eques
 †Réunion parrot, Psittacula eques eques - extinct mid-18th century
 †Mascarene parrot, Psittacula bensoni - extinct (c.1764) (formerly classified in genus †Lophopsittacus, and still considered such by some authorities)
 Rose-ringed parakeet, Psittacula krameri
 Alexandrine parakeet, Psittacula eupatria
 †Seychelles parakeet, Psittacula wardi - extinct (1883)
 Plum-headed parakeet, Psittacula cyanocephala
 Blossom-headed parakeet, Psittacula roseata
 Slaty-headed parakeet, Psittacula himalayana
 Grey-headed parakeet, Psittacula finschii
 Blue-winged parakeet, Psittacula columboides
 Layard's parakeet, Psittacula calthrapae
 Lord Derby's parakeet, Psittacula derbiana
 Red-breasted parakeet, Psittacula alexandri (also called moustached parrot)
 Long-tailed parakeet, Psittacula longicauda
 Nicobar parakeet, Psittacula caniceps

Alternative taxonomy 

Genetic evidence has found that the genus Psittacula is likely paraphyletic; for example, genetic analysis has supported merging short-tailed parrots of the genus Tanygnathus, Psittinus, and the extinct Mascarinus with Psittacula. A revised classification was proposed by Michael Braun and coworkers in 2019 that splits the genus Psittacula into multiple monophyletic genera in order to preserve Tanygnathus, Psittinus, and Mascarinus as distinct genera. After the proposed split, the only remaining species in Psittacula sensu stricto are P. derbiana, P. caniceps, and P. alexandri. This is also the taxonomic system followed by the IUCN Red List and BirdLife International. The list of split or monophyletic genera and species (and any of their allied species) is displayed below:

 Genus Himalayapsitta
Plum-headed parakeet, Himalayapsitta cyanocephala
 Grey-headed parakeet, Himalayapsitta finschii
 Slaty-headed parakeet, Himalayapsitta himalayana
Blossom-headed parakeet, Himalayapsitta roseata
 Genus Nicopsitta
Blue-winged parakeet, Nicopsitta columboides
Layard's parakeet, Nicopsitta calthrapae
 Genus Belocercus
Long-tailed parakeet, Belocercus longicauda
 Genus Psittacula
Red-breasted parakeet, Psittacula alexandri
 Lord Derby's parakeet, Psittacula derbiana
Nicobar parakeet, Psittacula caniceps
 Genus Palaeornis
Alexandrine parakeet, Palaeornis eupatria
 †Seychelles parakeet, Palaeornis wardi 
 Genus Alexandrinus
Rose-ringed parakeet, Alexandrinus krameri
 †Newton's parakeet, Alexandrinus exsul  
 Mauritius parakeet, Alexandrinus (eques) echo
 Genus Tanygnathus 
Great-billed parrot, Tanygnathus megalorynchos
 Blue-naped parrot, Tanygnathus lucionensis
 Blue-backed parrot, Tanygnathus sumatranus
 Black-lored parrot, Tanygnathus gramineus
 Genus Psittinus
Blue-rumped parrot, Psittinus cyanurus
 Simeulue parrot, Psittinus abbotti 
 Genus †Mascarinus
†Mascarene parrot, Mascarinus mascarin
Genus †Lophopsittacus
†Mascarene grey parakeet, Lophopsittacus bensoni

The extinct Mascarene grey parrot(P. bensoni) was not sampled in the study and has not been reclassified to Psittacula sensu lato by the IUCN or BirdLife, so it is still classified in Lophopsittacus under this taxonomy. The Nicobar parrot(P. caniceps) was also not sampled but kept in Psittacula by the authorities that incorporated this taxonomy.

The study has also found that the rose-ringed and red-breasted parrots are likely paraphyletic species themselves, and thus need to be split into multiple species.

Hypothetical extinct species 
The Rothschild's or intermediate parakeet P. intermedia, found in northern India, was formerly considered a mystery, as only very few specimens were known. It has since been demonstrated to be a hybrid between the slaty-headed parrot P. himalayana and the plum-headed parrot P. cyanocephala.

The taxonomy of the Réunion parrot P. eques is also confusing.  Extinct since 1770, little evidence even exists of the bird's existence. A study skin had been discovered at the Royal Museum of Scotland, explicitly referencing a book description of the Réunion birds. It is known from other descriptions, as well as illustrations of which it is unknown whether they were drawn from live or stuffed specimens.  This may be the only material proof of these birds' existence. Taxonomists are unsure if the birds were a distinct species, or conspecific with the Mauritius parrot, although genetic analysis supports it being a subspecies of the Mauritius parrot.

References

External links

 Psittacula World
 Stamps featuring Parrots including Psittacula
 Images and German Descriptions

 
Bird genera
Psittaculini
Taxa named by Georges Cuvier